Oleh Yuriiovych Plotnytskyi, or Oleh Plotnytsʼkyy (born 5 June 1997) is a Ukrainian professional volleyball player. He is a member of the Ukraine national team. At the professional club level, he plays for Sir Safety Perugia.

Honours

Clubs
 FIVB Club World Championship
  Betim 2022 – with Sir Safety Perugia
 CEV Challenge Cup
  2018/2019 – with Vero Volley Monza
 National championships
 2015/2016  Ukrainian Cup, with Lokomotiv Kharkiv
 2015/2016  Ukrainian Championship, with Lokomotiv Kharkiv
 2016/2017  Ukrainian Championship, with Lokomotiv Kharkiv
 2019/2020  Italian SuperCup, with Sir Safety Perugia
 2020/2021  Italian SuperCup, with Sir Safety Perugia
 2021/2022  Italian Cup, with Sir Safety Perugia
 2022/2023  Italian Super Cup, with Sir Safety Susa Perugia

Youth national team
 2016   CEV U20 European Championship

Individual awards
 2016: CEV U20 European Championship – Most Valuable Player
 2016: CEV U20 European Championship – Best Outside Spiker
 2022: Italian SuperCup – Most Valuable Player of the Final

References

External links

 
 Player profile at LegaVolley.it 
 Player profile at Volleybox.net

1997 births
Living people
Sportspeople from Vinnytsia
Ukrainian men's volleyball players
European Games competitors for Ukraine
Beach volleyball players at the 2014 Summer Youth Olympics
Beach volleyball players at the 2015 European Games
Ukrainian expatriate sportspeople in Italy
Expatriate volleyball players in Italy
VC Lokomotyv Kharkiv players
Outside hitters
21st-century Ukrainian people